Megan McDonnell is an American screenwriter best known for her work on Marvel Cinematic Universe projects WandaVision (2021) and The Marvels (2023).

Education 
McDonnell is a graduate of Harvard University where she was a member of the Hasty Pudding Club.

Career
McDonnell began her career as the co-director and executive producer on the 2016 short film Meet Cute. She then rose to prominence after writing two episodes of the Disney+ series WandaVision, set in the Marvel Cinematic Universe (MCU). In January 2020, she entered negotiations to write the screenplay for the 2023 MCU film The Marvels. In August 2022, she wrote episodes for the 2023 Marvel Studios series Agatha: Coven of Chaos.

Filmography

References

External links
 

21st-century American screenwriters
21st-century American women writers
American television writers
American women television writers
Harvard College alumni
Hasty Pudding alumni
Living people
Nebula Award winners
Place of birth missing (living people)
Year of birth missing (living people)